The Permanent Observer of Holy See to UNESCO is the representative of the Holy See to the United Nations Educational, Scientific and Cultural Organization (UNESCO), which is based in Paris. The Church also has representatives at the headquarters of the United Nations in New York and at the headquarters of a number of its other international bodies in Geneva and Nairobi.

The first to hold the position was Angelo Roncalli, who was also the Nuncio to France and a titular archbishop. Only one of his successors, Paolo Bertoli, has held those titles while serving as Permanent Observer. His immediate successor was typical of most: a priest who only became nuncio and archbishop when given his next assignment as Apostolic Nuncio to Costa Rica.

List of permanent observers 
 Angelo Roncalli (9 June 1952 – 12 January 1953)
 Giuseppe Sensi (16 May 1953 – 21 May 1955)
 unknown
 Angelo Pedroni (4 November 1960 – 7 April 1965)
 Giovanni Benelli (1964 – 1966)
 unknown 
 Luigi Conti (9 August 1971 – 5 August 1975)
 Lorenzo Frana (13 August 1975 – 11 May 2002)
 Francesco Follo (11 May 2002 – 11 November 2021)
 Eric Soviguidi (11 November 2021 - present)

See also
Foreign relations of the Holy See
List of diplomatic missions of the Holy See

Notes

References

UNESCO